Patrick Brennan may refer to:

P. J. Brennan (born 1986), American actor
Pádraig Brennan (born 1978), Irish Gaelic football player
Patrick Brennan (police officer), Irish politician, TD 1921–1923, Assistant Commissioner of the Garda Síochána
Paudge Brennan (Patrick Brennan, 1922–1998), Irish Fianna Fáil TD and Senator
Patrick Brennan (lacrosse) (1877–1961), who represented Canada at the 1908 Summer Olympics
Paddy Brennan (born 1930), Irish comics artist
Paddy Brennan (jockey) (born 1981), Irish jockey
Patrick Brennan (politician) (born 1953), Republican politician in the Vermont House of Representatives
Patrick Brennan (actor) (born 1974), American actor
Patrick Thomas Brennan (1901–1950), American Catholic missionary priest